Mount Buke Levu is the highest mountain on Kadavu Island in Fiji.

External links 
 Peakbagger.com

Buke Levu
Kadavu Province